The Table of Indexing Chinese Character Components is a lexicographic tool used to order the Chinese characters in mainland China.  The specification is also known as GF 0011-2009.

In China's normative documents, "radical" is defined as any component or  piānpáng of Chinese characters, while  is translated as "indexing component".

History 
In 1983, the Committee for Reforming the Chinese Written Language and the State Administration of Publication of China published The Table of Unified Indexing Chinese Character Components (Draft), a draft version of the current standard. In 2009, the Ministry of Education of the People's Republic of China and the State Language Work Committee issued The Table of Indexing Chinese Character Components (GF 0011-2009 ), which includes 201 principal indexing components and 100 associated indexing components

Usage 
This table has been adopted in the newer versions of Xinhua Zidian and Xiandai Hanyu Cidian. While mainland China has a different method to identify a Chinese character's indexing component (as prescribed in "" Specification for Identifying Indexing Components of GB 13000.1 Chinese Characters Set) from Traditional Chinese dictionaries, many dictionaries (usually arranged in hanyu pinyin order) index Chinese character in a "multi-entry" way which allow readers to look up a character through different radicals.

The specification specifies the table may also be used in Traditional Chinese dictionaries or dictionaries that collect both traditional and simplified forms of Chinese characters with some necessary adjustments.

List of radicals 
 1 stroke: 

 2 strokes: 

 3 strokes: 

 4 strokes: 

 5 strokes: 

 6 strokes: 

 7 strokes: 

 8 strokes: 

 9 strokes: 

 10 strokes: 

 11 strokes: 

 12 strokes: 

 13 strokes: 

 14 strokes: 

 17 strokes:

See also
 Radical (Chinese character)
 List of Shuowen Jiezi radicals
 List of Unicode radicals
 Unicode chart - Kangxi Radicals
 Unicode Chart - CJK Radicals Supplement
 List of Kangxi radicals - 214 radicals
 Table of Japanese kanji radicals
 Simplified table of Japanese kanji radicals

References

Chinese language
Chinese dictionaries
Collation